Yoshio Ninomine (born 2 July 1942) is a Japanese biathlete. He competed in the 20 km individual event at the 1964 Winter Olympics.

References

1942 births
Living people
Japanese male biathletes
Olympic biathletes of Japan
Biathletes at the 1964 Winter Olympics
Sportspeople from Hokkaido